In optics, a dichroic material is either one which causes visible light to be split up into distinct beams of different wavelengths (colours) (not to be confused with dispersion), or one in which light rays having different polarizations are absorbed by different amounts.

In beam splitters

The original meaning of dichroic, from the Greek dikhroos, two-coloured, refers to any optical device which can split a beam of light into two beams with differing wavelengths. Such devices include mirrors and filters, usually treated with optical coatings, which are designed to reflect light over a certain range of wavelengths and transmit light which is outside that range. An example is the dichroic prism, used in some camcorders, which uses several coatings to split light into red, green and blue components for recording on separate CCD arrays, however it is now more common to have a Bayer filter to filter individual pixels on a single CCD array. This kind of dichroic device does not usually depend on the polarization of the light. The term dichromatic is also used in this sense.

With polarized light

The second meaning of dichroic refers to the property of a material, in which light in different polarization states traveling through it experiences a different absorption coefficient; this is also known as diattenuation. When the polarization states in question are right and left-handed circular polarization, it is then known as circular dichroism (CD). Most materials exhibiting CD are chiral, although non-chiral materials showing CD have been recently observed. Since the left- and right-handed circular polarizations represent two spin angular momentum (SAM) states, in this case for a photon, this dichroism can also be thought of as spin angular momentum dichroism and could be modelled using quantum mechanics.

In some crystals,, such as tourmaline, the strength of the dichroic effect varies strongly with the wavelength of the light, making them appear to have different colours when viewed with light having differing polarizations. This is more generally referred to as pleochroism, and the technique can be used in mineralogy to identify minerals. In some materials, such as herapathite (iodoquinine sulfate) or Polaroid sheets, the effect is not strongly dependent on wavelength.

In liquid crystals
Dichroism, in the second meaning above, occurs in liquid crystals due to either the optical anisotropy of the molecular structure or the presence of impurities or the presence of dichroic dyes. The latter is also called a guest–host effect.

See also
 Birefringence
 Dichromatism
 Lycurgus Cup
 Pleochroism

References

Polarization (waves)